In algebraic topology, a G-spectrum is a spectrum with an action of a (finite) group.

Let X be a spectrum with an action of a finite group G. The important notion is that of the homotopy fixed point set . There is always

a map from the fixed point spectrum to a homotopy fixed point spectrum (because, by definition,  is the mapping spectrum .)

Example:  acts on the complex K-theory KU by taking the conjugate bundle of a complex vector bundle. Then , the real K-theory.

G-Galois extension in the sense of Rognes 
This notion is due to J. Rognes . Let A be an E∞-ring with an action of a finite group G and B = AhG its invariant subring. Then B → A (the map of B-algebras in E∞-sense) is said to be a G-Galois extension if the natural map

(which generalizes  in the classical setup) is an equivalence. The extension is faithful if the Bousfield classes of A, B over B are equivalent.

Example: KO → KU is a ℤ./2-Galois extension.

See also 
Segal conjecture

References

External links 

Algebraic topology
Homotopy theory